Leszek Eugeniusz Marks (born 1951 in Warsaw) is a Polish geologist, professor ordinarius (since 1998), currently (2016) at the Warsaw University, Department of Climate Geology; and the Polish Geological Institute-National Research Institute (PIG-PIB), president of Committee for Quaternary Research of the Polish Academy of Sciences. At present (2016), member of editorial boards of scientific journals Boreas, "Litosfera", "Geography and Geology", and Studia Quaternaria (editor-in-chief).

References

1951 births
Living people
20th-century Polish geologists
Academic staff of the University of Warsaw
21st-century Polish geologists